Moira Leiper Ducharme was the first female mayor of Halifax, Nova Scotia (1991–1994). Ducharme lives in Windsor Forks, Nova Scotia.

She was previously the President of Soccer Nova Scotia.

References

Year of birth missing (living people)
Living people
Acadian people
Mayors of Halifax, Nova Scotia
Women mayors of places in Nova Scotia